Uwe-Michael Wischhoff (born 9 November 1949), known by his stage name Mike Mareen, is a German singer, songwriter and musician.

His first musical success was with the band Cemetery Institution who played at Hamburg's Star-Club. Mareen later became a merchant sailor, a job which eventually took him to New York City where he played with several American groups. Upon his return to Europe, Mareen became involved with the production of Euro disco records. During the 1980s, he had some considerable success, with frequent television appearances in Germany and Eastern Europe. His biggest hits were "Dancing In The Dark" (1984) and "Love Spy" (1986). "Love Spy" peaked at number 98 in Australia in December 1986.

Discography

Albums 
 1979 - Mike Mareen 70's
 1985 - Dance Control
 1986 - Love Spy
 1987 - Let's Start Now
 1988 - Synthesizer Control
 2000 - TV Talk 2000
 2004 - Darkness & Light

Compilations 
 1998 - The Best of Mike Mareen

References

Sources

External links 

 
 

1949 births
Living people
20th-century German composers
20th-century German male singers
21st-century German composers
21st-century German male singers
German electronic musicians
German male singers
German male singer-songwriters
German multi-instrumentalists
Musicians from Berlin
Singers from Berlin